Sphenophorus callosus, the southern corn billbug, is a species of snout or bark beetle in the family Curculionidae. It is found in North America.

References

Further reading

 
 
 
 

Dryophthorinae
Beetles described in 1807